The Georgia Lady Bulldogs track and field team represents University of Georgia in NCAA Division I women's indoor and outdoor track and field.

In 2018, Keturah Orji became the first Bulldog to win The Bowerman, an award that honors collegiate track & field's most outstanding athlete of the year. Orji was also the first three-time finalist for the award.

References

External links
 

 

Sports clubs established in 1980
1980 establishments in Georgia (U.S. state)